Mary Helen McPhillips (1931–1998), was a noted television personality.

TV and radio career
McPhillips worked for CBC and CHUM radio in Canada. She moved to New York  to work for WOR-TV and radio. She spent 20 years at the company. She appeared on Straight Talk as a public-affairs host in the 1970s and 1980s, The Martha Deane program, News at Noon as news anchor in the 1960s. She also appeared on the Mutual Broadcasting Network and on The John Gambling morning radio program.

Death
She died from heart failure on December 16, 1998, aged 67 in New York.

Nominations
nominated for 1973-1974 NEW YORK area award

References

Television anchors from New York City
Canadian television hosts
1998 deaths
1931 births